Hong Kong competed at the 2017 World Games held in Wrocław, Poland.

Medalists

Bowling 

Wu Siu Hong and Michael Mak won the bronze medal in the men's doubles event.

Squash

Joey Chan won the silver medal in the women's singles event.

References 

Nations at the 2017 World Games
2017 in Hong Kong sport
2017